Robert Henry Lawrence Phillipson (born 18 March 1942 in Gourock, Scotland) is Professor Emeritus in the Department of Management, Society and Communication at Copenhagen Business School in Denmark. He is best known for his seminal work on linguistic imperialism and language policy in Europe.

Education and career
Phillipson was born in Scotland in 1942. He received his B.A. in 1964 and his M.A. in 1967, both in Modern Languages (French and German) and Law, from the University of Cambridge. He obtained his second M.A. in Linguistics and English Language Teaching from Leeds University in 1969. He earned his Ph.D., with distinction, in Education from the University of Amsterdam in 1990. He worked for the British Council from 1964 to 1973. He was associate professor in the Department of Languages and Culture at Roskilde University in Denmark from 1973 to 2000. He has been on the faculty of Copenhagen Business School since 2000. He also taught at the University of Copenhagen (1973-1984). He was Visiting Scholar at the Institute of Education at the University of London (1983), the University of Melbourne in Australia (1994), the Central Institute of Indian Languages in Mysore (1995), the University of Pecs in Hungary (1996) and the Center for Research in the Arts, Social Sciences and Humanities at the University of Cambridge (2005). He currently lives with his wife, Tove Skutnabb-Kangas, in Sweden.

Recognition
On 21 February 2010, Phillipson was awarded the Linguapax Prize along with Miquel Siguan i Soler. The Linguapax Institute describes them as "renowned advocates of multilingual education as a factor of peace and of linguistic rights against cultural and linguistic homogenization processes".

Linguistic imperialism
In his 1992 book, Phillipson made the first systematic attempt to theorize linguistic imperialism in relation to English language teaching. He offered the following working definition of English linguistic imperialism: “[T]he dominance of English is asserted and maintained by the establishment and continuous reconstitution of structural and cultural inequalities between English and other languages”. He recently listed seven constitutive traits of linguistic imperialism: (1) interlocking, (2) exploitative, (3) structural, (4) ideological, (5) hegemonic, (6) subtractive, and (7) unequal.

Books
 Phillipson, R. (1992). Linguistic imperialism. Oxford University Press.
 Phillipson, R. (Ed.). (2000). Rights to language: Equity, power and education. Lawrence Erlbaum Associates.
 Phillipson, R. (Ed.). (2003). English-only Europe? Challenging language policy. Routledge. 
 Phillipson, R. (2009). Linguistic imperialism continued. Orient Blackswan.
 Skutnabb-Kangas, T., & Phillipson, R. (Eds.). (1994). Linguistic human rights: Overcoming linguistic discrimination. Mouton de Gruyter.
 Skutnabb-Kangas, T., & Phillipson, R. (Eds.). (2017). Language rights. Routledge.
 Skutnabb-Kangas, T., & Phillipson, R. (Eds.). (2023). The handbook of linguistic human rights. John Wiley & Sons.

Articles
 Phillipson, R. (1997). Realities and myths of linguistic imperialism. Journal of Multilingual and Multicultural Development, 18(3), 238–248.
 Phillipson, R. (1998). Globalizing English: Are linguistic human rights an alternative to linguistic imperialism? Language Sciences, 20(1), 101–112.
 Phillipson, R. (2001). English for globalization or for the world's people? International Review of Education, 47(3), 185–200. 
 Phillipson, R. (2002). Global English and local language policies. In A. Kirkpatrick (Ed.), Englishes in Asia: Communication, identity, power and education (pp. 7–28). Melbourne, Australia: Language Australia. 
 Phillipson, R. (2008). The linguistic imperialism of neoliberal empire. Critical Inquiry in Language Studies, 5(1), 1–43.
 Phillipson, R. (2017). Myths and realities of "global" English. Language Policy, 16(3), 313–331. 
 Phillipson, R. (2022). A personal narrative of multilingual evolution. In R. Sachdeva & R. K. Agnihotri (Eds.), Being and becoming multilingual: Some narratives (pp. 63–83). Orient Blackswan. 
 Phillipson, R., & Skutnabb-Kangas, T. (1996). English only worldwide or language ecology? TESOL Quarterly, 30(3), 429–452. 
 Phillipson, R., & Skutnabb-Kangas, T. (2017). Linguistic imperialism and the consequences for language ecology. In A. F. Fill & H. Penz (Eds.), The Routledge handbook of ecolinguistics (pp. 121-134). Routledge.
 Phillipson, R., & Skutnabb-Kangas, T. (2022). Communicating in "global" English: Promoting linguistic human rights or complicit with linguicism and linguistic imperialism. In Y. Miike & J. Yin (Eds.), The handbook of global interventions in communication theory (pp. 425–439). Routledge.

References

See also
 Critical applied linguistics
 English as a second or foreign language 
 International English
 Language death
 Linguistic discrimination
 Language planning
 Language policy
 Linguistic imperialism
 Language rights
 Multilingualism

External links
 Robert Phillipson web page
 Dr. Robert Phillipson's articles, videos
 web page in Danish
 Keynote YouTube talk on Linguistic Imperialism
 conference in french senate

1942 births
Living people
Linguists from the United Kingdom
Academic staff of Copenhagen Business School
Linguistic rights
People from Gourock
University of Amsterdam alumni